Lindeberg may refer to:

Places
 Lindeberg, Akershus, a village in Sørum municipality, Norway
 Lindeberg Station, an Oslo Commuter Rail station
 Lindeberg, Oslo, an area of the borough Alna in Oslo, Norway
 Lindeberg (station), an Oslo Metro station

People
 Erik Lindeberg (born 1979), Swedish sprint canoer
 Harrie T. Lindeberg (1879–1959), American architect
 Jafet Lindeberg (1874–1962), Norwegian-born American gold prospector and co-founder of Nome, Alaska
 Jarl Waldemar Lindeberg (1876–1932), Finnish mathematician
 Johan Lindeberg (born 1957), Swedish fashion designer 
 Linda Lindeberg (1915–1973), American painter
 Staffan Lindeberg (1950–2016), Swedish physician and professor

Other uses
 J.Lindeberg, a Swedish clothing company founded by Johan Lindeberg

See also
 Lindberg (disambiguation)
 Lindbergh (disambiguation)